Longball or long ball may refer to:

Danish longball, a bat-and-ball game
Long ball, a soccer tactic
Long ball, baseball jargon for a home run